PS-10 Larkana-I is a constituency of the Provincial Assembly of Sindh.

General elections 2013

General elections 2008

See also
 PS-9 Shikarpur-III
 PS-11 Larkana-II

References

External links
 Election commission Pakistan's official website
 Awazoday.com check result
 Official Website of Government of Sindh

Constituencies of Sindh